Tomas Ivanovich Alibegov (in ; born June 18, 1937, Moscow, Soviet Union) is a Russian banker, Director General of Eurobank in Paris (1982–1987), Deputy Chairman of Vnesheconombank (1989–1997), PhD in Economics.

Biography 

Tomas Alibegov was born in Moscow into a family with Georgian and British roots: his father, Ivan Yakovlevich Alibegov, born in 1887 in Kutaisi, died in 1941 in the World War II; mother – Evelina Richardovna Manning, born in 1903 in Huddersfield, England, died in 1987 in Moscow.

In 1958, he graduated from the International Economic Relations Faculty of the Moscow Financial Institute. In 1958-1959 he worked at the Moscow Mechanical Plant.

In 1961–1969, he served as an inspector, expert, senior consultant, Head of a department head, Deputy head of the Office of Currency and Cash Operations of Vneshtorgbank. In 1969–1975, he had been Deputy Manager, Manager of the Moscow Narodny Bank's branch in Beirut, Lebanon under Viktor Gerashchenko. In 1975–1982, he returned to Vneshtorgbank of the USSR to become Head of the Office of Currency and Cash Operations. In 1982–1987 he served as Director General of Eurobank in Paris.

After 1987, he again worked at Vneshtorgbank as Head of the Foreign Exchange Department and the Department of State and Foreign Loans; In 1988–1989 he became Deputy Chairman of the Board – Head of the Office for Monetary and Credit Cooperation with the Socialist countries. While in this office, he dealt with the issues of external borrowing and turning the rouble into a freely convertible currency. In 1989–1997, Alibegov served as First Deputy Chairman and acting Chairman of Vnesheconombank. In the early 1990s, he was mentioned regularly in the world mass media on the issue of restructuring the external debt of the USSR. Another problem was that Soviet enterprises tried to hide their assets, transferring foreign currency from their accounts for abroad.

Later on, he was a member of the Board of Directors of the Bank for Corporate Financing (Faba Bank LLP).

Recognition 
 Order of the Red Banner of Labour

Family

Married with two children.

References

1937 births
Living people
Financial University under the Government of the Russian Federation alumni
Recipients of the Order of the Red Banner of Labour
Russian bankers
Soviet bankers